Isara carbonaria is a medium-large species of sea snail, a marine gastropod mollusc in the family Mitridae, the miter snails or miter shells. This species occurs in Australia and New Zealand.

References

 Powell A. W. B., New Zealand Mollusca, William Collins Publishers Ltd, Auckland, New Zealand 1979 

Mitridae
Gastropods of Australia
Gastropods of New Zealand
Fauna of Western Australia
Gastropods described in 1822